The 2004 Sacramento State Hornets football team represented California State University, Sacramento as a member of the Big Sky Conference during the 2004 NCAA Division I-AA football season. Led by second-year head coach Steve Mooshagian, Sacramento State compiled an overall record of 3–8 with a mark of 2–5 in conference play, tying for sixth place in the Big Sky. The team was outscored by its opponents 415 to 190 for the season. The Hornets played home games at Hornet Stadium in Sacramento, California.

Schedule

Team players in the NFL
No Sacramento State players were selected in the 2005 NFL Draft.

The following finished their college career in 2004, were not drafted, but played in the NFL.

References

Sacramento State
Sacramento State Hornets football seasons
Sacramento State Hornets football